Sphenobaiera is a form genus for plant leaves found in rocks from Triassic to Cretaceous periods. The genus Sphenobaiera is used for plants with wedge-shaped leaves that can be distinguished from Ginkgo, Ginkgoites and Baiera by the lack of a petiole. The family to which this genus belongs has not been conclusively established; an affinity with the Karkeniaceae has been suggested on morphological grounds.

Locations
Sphenobaiera ikorfatensis (Seward) Florin f. papillata Samylina has been found in Lower Cretaceous formations of Western Greenland, the Upper Jurassic of the Asiatic USSR, and the basal rock unit of the Lakota formation of the Black Hills, which Fontaine considered to be of Lower Cretaceous age. It is a ginkgophyte.

In Paleorrota geopark in Brazil. Upper Triassic period, the Santa Maria Formation.

References

Prehistoric gymnosperm genera
Late Cretaceous plants
Ginkgophyta